Central Park was a rugby league stadium in Wigan, England, which was the home of Wigan RLFC before the club moved to the JJB Stadium in 1999. Its final capacity was 18,000. The site is now a Tesco supermarket.

History
On 6 September 1902, Wigan played at Central Park for the first time in the opening match of the newly formed First Division. An estimated crowd of 9,000 spectators saw Wigan beat Batley 14–8.

The first rugby league international was played between England and Other Nationalities at Central Park on 5 April 1904, Other Nationalities won 9-3 in the experimental -less 12-a-side game, with Wigan players David "Dai" Harris, and Eli Davies in the Other Nationalities team.

The visit of St. Helens on 27 March 1959 produced Central Park's record attendance of 47,747, and set a record for a rugby league regular season league game in Britain. Wigan won the game 19–14, holding off a Saints comeback after having led 14–0.

Floodlights were installed on 120 ft high pylons in summer 1967 so that the club could play in the BBC2 Floodlit Trophy.

On 7 October 1987, Central Park was the first English venue used for the World Club Challenge (WCC) between the English champions and the Winfield Cup premiers from Australia. The 1987 World Club Challenge between Wigan and Manly-Warringah saw the home side run out 8-2 winners in a try-less game in front of 36,895, though many who were there believe the attendance was closer to 50,000 on the night, far exceeding the 36,000 capacity of the ground at the time. The game was marred by several all-in brawls, while Manly captain Paul Vautin was almost pushed over the fence and into the crowd by a group of Wigan players who had tackled him into touch, the incident sparking another all-in. Second-rower Ron Gibbs became the first player to be sent off in a WCC after hitting Wigan centre Joe Lydon with an elbow to the head after Lydon attempted a field goal, while later in the game Manly fullback Dale Shearer appeared to step on Lydon's head while getting up from a tackle.

Nevertheless, the success of the match and its high attendance saw the World Club Challenge made into an annual event between the English and Australian champions starting in 1989.

A week after the 1992 Rugby League World Cup Final (WCF) at Wembley Stadium which saw Australia defeat Great Britain 10-6, Central Park hosted the 1992 World Club Challenge between Wigan and the Brisbane Broncos. With twelve players who played in the WCF playing the challenge (5 from Wigan, 7 from Brisbane), the Broncos became the first Australian side to win the challenge in England with a 22-8 victory in front of 17,764 fans. Wigan would get their revenge just two years later when they defeated the Broncos 20-14 in the 1994 World Club Challenge played in front of a WCC record attendance of 54,220 at the ANZ Stadium in Brisbane. Several thousand fans travelled to Brisbane to support the team, and the win saw Wigan become the first English team to win the Challenge on Australian soil.

In January 1997 the club's shareholders approved a deal in which the stadium would be sold to Wigan Athletic's owner Dave Whelan and be redeveloped to provide  a new home for both the football and rugby teams. Two months later however, the Warriors' chairman Jack Robinson accepted a rival bid from Tesco, pointing out that the supermarket's offer was three times bigger than Whelan's.

The final game at Central Park was on Sunday 5 September 1999. Wigan beat St Helens by 28 points to 20, 96 years and 364 days after the first game against Batley was played. The Central Park site later became a car park for a Tesco supermarket.

Rugby League Test Matches
List of rugby league test matches played at Central Park.

Rugby League Tour Matches
Other than Wigan club games and test matches, Central Park was also a regular host to various international touring teams from 1907–1994.

World Club Challenge/Championship
Central Park hosted 5 World Club Challenge games between 1987–1997.

See also
English rugby league stadia by capacity

References

External links
Wigan Warriors Official
Central Park History Page @ Cherry & White.co.uk
Wigan-Warriors

Defunct rugby league venues in England
Rugby League World Cup stadiums
Defunct sports venues in Greater Manchester
Sport in Wigan
Demolished buildings and structures in Greater Manchester
Buildings and structures in Wigan
Demolished sports venues in the United Kingdom